Karbi Anglong district is one of the 34 administrative districts of Assam in India. Diphu is the administrative headquarter of the district. The district is administered by Karbi Anglong Autonomous Council according to the Sixth Schedule of the Constitution of India.

Etymology
The name "Karbi Anglong" is derived from Karbi language. The word Karbi is the name of indigenous tribe living in and around the region. The origin of the word Karbi is unknown. The tribe call themselves as Arleng, meaning "Humans." Anglong  is homonym noun for Hills and Mountains.

History

Pre independence
Prior to the pre-British rule in North East India, the territory of Karbi Anglong was never properly or scientifically demarcated; and it was also not a part of any properly established external government or kingdom. There could be some suppression and occupation here and there by their neighboring people groups or kingdoms, but there are no plausible historical evidences to support the claims that the people of Karbi Anglong as a whole were under an external dominion.The British, under their subjugation, constituted and declared the land of the Karbi people as a ‘Scheduled District’ in 1874. Later, Mikir Hills track was constituted as "Partially Excluded areas" under the Govt. of India Act, 1935.

Post independence
On November 17, 1951, now defunct United Mikir Hills and North Cachar Hills district was created by combining some parts of the districts of the now Golaghat, Nagaon, Cachar and United Khasi and Jaintia Hills district of present-day Meghalaya state.

This was followed by bifurcation of the erstwhile district of United Mikir and North Cachar Hills into two separate districts — Mikir Hills district and North Cachar Hills district — on 2 February 1970. Mikir Hills district was renamed as Karbi Anglong district on 14 October 1976.

In 2016, the district was divided into 2 new districts. The western part of the district including Hamren, Donkamokam and other adjoining areas forming the new district of West Karbi Anglong. Hamren is made the headquarter of the newly created district.

Aspiration for statehood

The area that comprises the present district of Karbi-Anglong was outside the political sphere of the Ahom kingdom  prior to the British colonization of this region. After the recommendation of Simon Commission, the hill area of Karbi Anglong was given a different status under Section 92 of the Government of India Act 1935 and area was placed under the category of "Partially Excluded Areas". The Government of Assam by this law holds no political power over the excluded areas which were administered under the special power of the Governor.

In the year 1937, political leaders such Semsonsing Ingti, Seng Bey and Khorsing Terang in a memorandum to Assam Governor, Sir Robert Neil Reid,   demanded a separate hill district for Mikirs. A regional political forum, called Karbi-A-Durbar, was formed to intensify the movement.

After the formation of Indian Union, several ethnic communities of Northeast India like Naga people, Mizo people, Bodo people and Khasi people began demanding separate statehood and a complete independent identity for their own. These demands were agitated both by common people and by a group of insurgents. The Congress Government of Assam in 1960, declared Assamese language as the official language of the State ignoring existence of multiple tribes and languages, causing discontent among the various indigenous tribes, which formed majority of erstwhile state of Assam. This led to the formation of Nagaland State in 1963 and State of Meghalaya in 1971. The then unified districts (Karbi Anglong district & Dima Hasao district) were invited to join the newly created Meghalaya. The twin districts vetoed to join the newly createtd State of Meghalaya, after the assurance of greater independence from State of Assam.

Though the same assurance by State of Assam remain partly or wholly unfulfilled and diluted through decades. This led to several memorandums, wave of agitations in the twin Districts of Karbi Anglong district and Dima Hasao district complaining of lack of fulfilment, infiltration in the Sixth schedule, ignorance and imposition of Assamese towards these districts by the State of Assam.

In 2013, in a joint agitation Bodo, Dimasa and Karbi disrupted transport service through highway and railway in their respective districts. Eventually, leading in lose of 2 lives due to police firing and damages to many public and private property.

The district is also a hotbed of militant activities who aspire to achieve statehood though violence. UPDS, now defunct, has come overground for overall good, peace and development of the region and people.

Geography

Topography
The districts plateau are an extension of the Indian Plate (The Peninsular Block) in the Northeast India. This area receives maximum rainfall from the Southwest summer Monsoon from June through September. Numerous rivers and tributaries flow in these districts such as the Dhansiri, Longnit, Jamuna, Kolioni and Nambor. The district is bounded by Golaghat district on the east and on the north, Meghalaya state and Morigaon district on the west, Nagaon and Dima Hasao district and Nagaland state on the south. The district is located between 25º 33′ and 26º 35′ North latitude and from 92º 10′ to 93º 50′ East longitude.

Flora and fauna

About 40% of Karbi Anglong is covered with forest. According to MSME-Development Institute, Diphu The important forest types found in Karbi Anglong District are: Moist semi-evergreen forests, Moist Mixed Deciduous forests, Riverain Type and Miscellaneous type with scattered pure or mixed patches of bamboos. These forest areas are natural museums of living giant trees, a treasure house of rare, endemic and endangered species, a dispensary of medicinal plants, a garden for Botanists, a gene bank for economically important organisms, a paradise for nature lovers and a laboratory for environmentalists. Threatened species in the area include Asian elephant, Bengal tiger, Clouded leopard and Leopard, Hoolock gibbon, Pangolin, Porcupine Slow loris etc. The district includes five wildlife sanctuaries, two elephant reserves (Dhansiri – Lumding and Kaziranga – Karbi Anglong) and 17 District Council Reserve Forests (DCRFs). Other four Wildlife Sanctuaries are East Karbi-Anglong Wildlife Sanctuary, Marat Longri Wildlife Sanctuary, Nambor Wildlife Sanctuary and North Karbi-Anglong Wildlife Sanctuary. However, the forests and wildlife of these districts continue to face threats from deforestation and human activities, some of them illegal. Illegal minings is an immense concern as it very much contributes to ecological disturbance.

Climate
Due to variation in the topography, this hill zone experiences different climates in different parts. The winter commences from October and continues till February. During summer, the atmosphere becomes sultry. The temperature ranges from 6-12° in winter and 23-32° in summer. The average rainfall is about 2416 mm.

Politics
Articles 244(A) and 275(1), "Sixth Schedule" of the Constitution of India provides "Mini Constitution" to some Autonomous regions of India. In these regions, elections are held according to "District Council Election Rules". Like other Autonomous region, the Karbi Anglong districts are also empowered to frame their own "District Council Election Rules" under "Sixth Schedule" and elect its members from ST (Schedule Tribe) to the Councils. Since many tribal are hardly aware of this special provisions, non-ST politicians have been contesting MAC elections in the council. Recently PIL ( PIL No. 9/2017) was filed in the Gauhati High Court and Diphu Judicial Court against non-Tribal elected in the council. The Gauhati High Court in its final verdict on July 13, 2018, directed the KAAC to frame new acts and rules under paragraph 2 (7) of the Sixth Schedule for preparation of electoral roll. As of now, there has been no completion of "District Council Election Rules" by the KAAC surpassing the duration limit ordered by the Court.

Constituency 
There are three Vidhan Sabha constituencies in the district, namely Bokajan, Howraghat and Diphu. All are part of 3 S.T. Autonomous District Lok Sabha constituency of Assam designated for scheduled tribes.

Administration
The district is under the administration of Karbi Anglong Autonomous Council. Diphu is the district headquarter, as well administrative headquarters of the same. The CEM of Karbi Anglong Autonomous Council is the chairperson and chief executive of the council and district respectively, supported by twenty six other Executive Members of the council. The Principal Secretary, Karbi Anglong Autonomous Council is the administrative head of the districts. The Deputy Commissioners is responsible for maintenance of Law and Order, Administration of Justice. Other important town of the districts is Bokajan. As per 2011 census, Total number of villages in the district is 2073 with combined 11 Development Blocks to look after the development activities in the district.

Economy
In 2006, the Indian government named Karbi Anglong one of the country's 250 most backward districts (out of a total of 640). It is one of the eleven districts in Assam currently receiving funds from the Backward Regions Grant Fund Programme (BRGF).

The GDP of the district was 2,198.39 crore (13th among Districts of Assam) based at constant price (2004-2005) for year 2009–10. Agriculture is the main source of income for the people along with Horticulture, Livestock, Plantation, Sericulture, Weaving, etc. Tribals are generally self-sufficient. They mostly rely on wild vegetables found in hills both for domestic consumption and commercial purpose.

Ginger
Karbi Anglong ginger has been granted geographical indication (GI) rights by the GI Registry of India. About 10,000 farmers grow ginger. The average annual production in Karbi Anglong is 30,000 tonnes.

Rubber
in 2017–18 with a total area of 8,589.85 hectare and production of 2,925 million tonnes (third among inter districts of Assam) it generated 26,800 employments.

Tea
As per the Statistical Hand Book Assam, 2018 the district has 1,590 tea growers registered with Tea Board of India with total area of 2,488.21 hectare. In 2017, the district's tea production was 4.59 million kg and stood at No.12 among other districts of Assam.

The region also produces significant numbers of Areca nut, Baccaurea ramiflora, Beans, Jackfruit, Maize, Orange (fruit), Peach, Pineapple, Potato and Sweet potato, Plum, Sugarcane, Tapioca, Turmeric, etc. One of CCI working factory (out of three) called Bokajan Cement Factory is located in Bokajan. Its product is exported to the whole country.

Potentiality for development
The district is rich in mineral resources. It has Feldspar and Limestone reserve's. According to the Ministry of Micro, Small and Medium Enterprises, Karbi Anglong has reserve Coal of 1.3 m. tonnes, Granite of 30 m. cum and Kaolinite of 0.7 m. tonnes.

Demographics

Population
According to the 2011 census, Karbi Anglong District has a population of 965,280, This gives it a ranking of 451st in India (out of a total of 640). Its population growth rate over the decade 2001-2011 was 17.58%. Karbi Anglong has a sex ratio of 951 females for every 1000 males, and a literacy rate of 74%, with Male and Female constituting 82% and 65% respectively. The residual district has a population of 660,955. In the residual district, Scheduled Castes and Scheduled Tribes are 33,523 and 345,220 which is 5.07% and 52.23% of the population respectively.

Religion

Those practicing are Hinduism are 531,167 (80.36%) of the population. Christianity is the second largest religion comprising 101,251 (15.32%) of the population. Muslims are 19,057 (2.88%) while Buddhists are 5,767 (0.87%) of the population.

Languages

At the time of the 2011 census, 43.94% of the population spoke Karbi, 13.02% Bengali, 9.03% Assamese, 6.04% Boro, 4.67% Nepali, 3.70% Hindi, 2.65% Dimasa, 2.17% Bhojpuri, 1.90% Sadri, 1.39% Kuki and 1.22% Garo as their first language.

Karbi, Assamese, Hindi and English language are used as the common language for communicating among different communities residing in district.

Culture
With Karbi as majority, there also exist numerous other ethnic groups like Paite, Tiwa and Hmar are found scattered in the district. All these ethnicity represents different and unique identities, customs and traditions, clothing, food and religions of their own, yet they share many common practices making them self-sufficient, satisfied and less dependent from outside supplies than the rest of conventional civilized sections. They all rely on Bamboo for their essential frequent use including food (bamboo sprout) and house building materials, curve out utensils from wood, spin out cotton, jhum cultivation, non-dowry practice, local hygienic green vegetables instead of regular green market, clothes manufacturing, and so on.

Karbi Youth Festival is an annual festival celebrated by the Karbi people of Assam along with other tribals to propagate and display their rich culture and traditions in one platform. It is celebrated between 15 and 19 February of every year in Taralangso, Diphu, Karbi Anglong District. It is locally called Karbi Riso-Nimso Rong Aje.

Demographics issues 
In 1971 Census of India, the Tribal population was at 65%, as of 2011, it stand at 56.3% with large numbers of illegal influx and encroachment from outside causing disturbance to both natural landscape & economic opportunities. Illegal issuance of land patta is also the major concern for the Indigenous tribal communities. The Karbi Anglong Autonomous Council, the Land Revenue and the Forest department of Karbi Anglong aided by Police and Executive Magistrate on 5 March 2019 demolished and evicted over 600 illegal structures and infiltrators built in Lankaijan Reserve Forest bordering Hojai district. On 31, August 10:00 am  (Indian Standard Time) the much awaited National Register of Citizens of India (Assam) was declared. 19,06,657 were excluded out of 3.11 Crore people from all over Assam. According to many news reports, both from Karbi Anglong (10th position) & West Karbi Anglong district (7th position) 14.31% & 15.47% of people were excluded from these respective areas'

Tourism

Places of interest
A hilly district of Assam, Karbi Anglong is still somewhat unknown to the tourist in spite of its natural green forest and hills. Some reasons are poor connectivity, infrastructure. Several places local origin name have been renamed by outsiders. Visitors frequent littering openly have caused serious threat to these places.

 Diphu
 It is a busy town located on a hill. There are tourist attractions in and around the town.
 Akashiganga
 15  km away from Dokmoka. A stream of water flows down from the high hill. In front of it, there is a Siva temple
 Dikrut Waterfall (also Paklongkam)
 It's a waterfall located on the mountain. Outsiders knows it by the name of Bhelughat.
 Garampani (also Langkar-om)
 Garampani Wildlife Sanctuary which is home of hoolock gibbon and golden langur. There is hot water spring in here near the National Highway-29 (also AH1).
 Kaipholangso
 in Dolamara vicinity under No. 26 Duarbagori MAC Constituency in Karbi Anglong and famous for its scenic beauty and bordering the enchanting hills. Outsiders knows it as Kakochang falls.
 Kangthilangso Waterfall
 It's a waterfall located in Kangthi village, around 12 km from Denarong (Dengaon).
 Longsokangthu (also Siloni)
 It is a picnic spot on the bank of a river, surrounded by hills and greenery.
 Silbheta (also Arlong-Ru-pat)
 It is a picnic spot located at a distance of 37 km from Diphu. The place surrounded by rain forests. A nature built stone bridge (dyke) with a waterfall is the main attraction of this place.
 Recreation Park
 Recreation Park is a Government run Recreational cum Medicinal garden. It is a place of attraction for the tourists. 
 Langvoku Waterfall
 Langvoku waterfall is 10km away from Manja (town) in Karbi Anglong (Assam). This place undoubtedly beautiful with its fountains. The place is located in Manja-Dilai area of the district. 
 Tokolangso Waterfall
 Tokolangso waterfall is on a hilly spot. The water falls down straight from the hilltop. The water is very cold and crystal clear in appearance. The place is located in Balipathar, 14km away from Bokajan.

Education
Karbi Anglong's major educational institutions are:

Universities
Assam University, Diphu Campus
 Located in hilly terrain spreading over 273 bighas allotted by Karbi Anglong Autonomous District Council authority. It is about 8km westward from downtown Diphu towards Lumding. The campus is a pioneering higher-level study centre in this remote eastern part of the country. The Campus offers different Post-Graduate courses and research facilities.

Medical Colleges
Diphu Medical College and Hospital

Colleges
The district has many well established colleges. Among them, Diphu Government College, is the only NAAC accredited government higher educational institution in the district. Other notably colleges are Diphu Law College; Don Bosco College, Diphu; Eastern Karbi Anglong College, Hanjanglangso (Sarihajan) and Thong Nokbe College, Dokmoka.

Technical institutes
Diphu polytechnic
Indian Technical Institute [ITI]

Schools
Schools in the district follow the State Board of Secondary Education, Assam curriculum. Many schools provides quality education to hill people. These established are run by Government, Private and Missionaries.Some well known schools are: Don Bosco Higher Secondary School, Diphu; Badan Memorial Higher Secondary School, Diphu; Diphu Govt. Boys Higher Secondary School, Diphu; Diphu Govt. Girls High School, Diphu; Howraghat Higher Secondary School, Howraghat; Jawahar Navodaya Vidyalaya, Diphu; Kendriya Vidyalaya, Diphu & Bokajan; Kidzee, Diphu; Vidhya Sagar High School, Bokajan; Krist Jyoti School, Dokmoka; Mount Calvary English High School, Diphu; Aturkimi Academy, Diphu and Presbyterian Mission High School, Diphu.

Media

Newspaper
The Arleng Daily, a Karbi daily, is a tabloid format newspaper that heralded a new beginning for Karbi newspaper. Thekar, a Karbi daily, is the first RNI Registered Karbi newspaper. Since then, there are several dailies in Karbi language. In the year of 2005–06, a Hindi newspaper Jana Prahari was launched from Baguliaghat, a small town in Karbi Anglong. 'Hill Observer' is an English Daily Newspaper published from Diphu. The Drongo Express, an English daily, is published from Diphu, Karbi Anglong. The Hills Times, a largely circulated English daily published from Diphu and printed in Guwahati.

Television
 Doordarshan TV relay centre, Diphu
 KAT News (Cable Channel), Diphu
 Karbi Anglong Live (Cable Channel), Hamren, West Karbi Anglong
 KaCOM (Cable Channel) not in function since 2015, Bokajan

Radio
 All India Radio, Diphu

Transportation

Road
The district is connected to other place by road though NH-36, NH-39 and NH-329.

Railway
Diphu and Bokajan railway station are the main railway station in the district.

Notable towns
 Amlakhi
 Bokajan
 Bokulia
 Diphu
 Dokmoka
 Howraghat
 Manja

Notable people
 Prof. Rongbong Terang, Padmashree awardee.
 Late Semsonsing Ingti, founder of Karbi Anglong district (the then Mikir Hills).
 Jayanta Rongpi
 Biren Sing Engti
 Joyram Engleng

See also
 West Karbi Anglong district
 List of districts of Assam
 Karbi Anglong Autonomous Council

References

External links
 Karbi Anglong district website

 
Former districts of Assam
States and territories established in 1970
1976 establishments in Assam